Wayne Elliot Mardle (born 10 May 1973) is an English former professional darts player who played in events of the Professional Darts Corporation (PDC) and British Darts Organisation (BDO). He was runner-up in three PDC majors, losing to Phil Taylor on each occasion.  He was also a five-time world semi-finalist. He currently works as a pundit and commentator.

He has been known as "Hawaii 501" since 2000, a play on the title of the popular television series Hawaii Five-O, due to the Hawaiian shirts he started wearing in 1998 for a bet, and 501 being the start score of a leg of darts. This dress sense coupled with his crowd-pleasing onstage activity (such as dancing to the interval music) saw him become one of the most popular players on the circuit.

Early life and career
Mardle was born in Dagenham, East London, England. He started playing darts at the age of 11, when he practised with his dad. His first 180 came two weeks after he started playing. He soon became better than his dad, and his first competition win was in a pub called the 'Double Top' on his thirteenth birthday in 1986.

His Lakeside debut came in 2000, where he lost to Matt Clark in the first round. In 2001, he reached the semi-finals, beating Co Stompé and Ronnie Baxter before losing to eventual winner John Walton. His attempt in 2002 saw him fall in the last eight to Colin Monk.

PDC career
Mardle joined the Professional Darts Corporation in time for the 2003 World Championship. His first appearance at the Circus Tavern saw him lose in the third round to Phil Taylor. His debut at Blackpool's Winter Gardens in the World Matchplay was much better, beating World Champion John Part, Alan Warriner and Colin Lloyd to reach the final, where he again lost to Taylor. From 2004 to 2006, Mardle reached three consecutive world championship semi-finals, losing to Taylor in 2004 and 2006, and Mark Dudbridge in 2005. He peaked at fifth in the World Rankings. He has always seemed to suffer from what Sid Waddell called the "Mardle Drift", which sees his Darts continually land in 5 and Treble 5 instead of the 20/Treble 20.

Mardle played in the first two editions of the Premier League,  in 2005 and 2006, 2008 and 2009. 2005 and 2006 did not go well, and he finished bottom of the table in both years. Players who come bottom of the League are said to have won the "Mardle Cup," named in honour of him. Poor form meant he was not selected in 2007.

In 2007, Mardle was beaten in the opening round of the World Championship by unseeded Alan Caves, and  subsequently failed to reach the latter stages of a single event that year. He found his form at the 2008 World Championship, and in a big upset he beat then-13-time champion Phil Taylor 5–4 in the quarter-finals, a match in which he had trailed 3–0. This was the first time in the history of the PDC championship that Taylor had been beaten before the final. After his win over Taylor, Mardle was made bookmakers' favourite to win the tournament, especially as his semi-final opponent was 21-year-old qualifier Kirk Shepherd, ranked 142nd. However, an over-confident Mardle lost the match 6–4. Mardle later described his attitude going into the match as "nonchalant" and stated that he did not give Shepherd the respect he deserved.

In January 2008 Mardle was confirmed as the Sky Sports wildcard entry to the 2008 Premier League following his impressive performance at the World Championships. Whilst this decision was questioned by some, Mardle proved the doubters wrong with a steady campaign which saw him finish in fifth place, missing out on the Play-Offs by just two legs to Adrian Lewis. He reached the semi-finals of the 2008 World Matchplay, losing 17–5 to James Wade.

At the 2009 Premier League, Mardle amassed only four points from his opening nine games, then missed week ten due to a virus. He had been due to return the following week, but was rushed into hospital the day before the matches due to mumps. With five matches to play in the final three weeks, one more missed week would eliminate Mardle from the competition. Having been passed fit for a week twelve return, Mardle was re-admitted to hospital, and in accordance with tournament regulations, was removed from the tournament. His results from the tournament were also annulled. Mardle later stated that his form never recovered after his six-month absence due to mumps.

Mardle made his final World Championship appearance in 2010, losing 3–0 to Jyhan Artut in the first round, averaging only 72. Mardle continued to drop out the rankings and was ranked as low as 85th in the Order of Merit.

Mardle also attempted to qualify for the 2012 PDC World Championship via the PDPA qualifier which was held in Wigan and was whitewashed 5–0 in the preliminary round by Ken Dobson.

Mardle's slide down the world rankings meant he was no longer assured of a PDC tour card to play on the Pro Tour, and had to enter the Q School to try and earn one. However, on the eve of the first Q School qualifier, Mardle announced on his Twitter page that he had decided not to go to Q School and instead focus on commentating for Sky Sports and playing in exhibitions.

Commentary
Mardle made his commentating debut for the PDC at the 2011 PDC World Darts Championship, working alongside Sid Waddell in a few matches. He also co-presented some of the event with Dave Clark and predicting some of the match results with Rod Harrington and Eric Bristow. Mardle continued his analyzing and commentary career at the 2011 Premier League Darts apart from weeks 3, 5, 9, 10, 11 and 14.

He continued his commentary career in the 2012 PDC World Darts Championship, where he co-commentated on every night of the televised event. He has since become a regular on all Sky televised tournaments both as a commentator during matches and as the main pundit in the studio portions of the show. During the World Championships Mardle also has regular segments where he rewards crowd participation, either dancing, fancy dress outfits or funny signs, with a "Wayne's World" T-shirt.

Mardle has been a keen advocate for the support of players suffering from Dartitis. In 2013, Mardle spoke about former 5 Time World Champion Eric Bristow and outlined that Dartitis was "the fear of throwing the dart" and emphasised how it "must've been awful" for Bristow. In 2017, Mardle supported Berry van Peer following a severe case of Dartitis during the Grand Slam of Darts in Wolverhampton. Despite this setback Mardle has outlined that Van Peer has "bounce back-ability" and has the potential to be a future World Champion.

Mardle's advocacy for players suffering from Dartitis has gone beyond the men's  tour to female players including rising star Beau Greaves. During Sky Sports coverage on the opening night of the 2023 PDC World Darts Championship, Mardle cited previous comments regarding Eric Bristow's Dartitis struggles. Mardle developed upon these, revealing that Greaves is "a superstar in the making" with the ability to overcome her own struggles and match the achievements of fellow Sky Sports presenter and Former 3 Time World Champion John Part.

Personal life
In 2006, Mardle had a darts book published (co-authored with Ian Spragg) entitled Hawaii 501 – Life as a Darts Pro. It chronicles the ups and downs of his life as a professional player during 2005.

Mardle supports the football team Tottenham Hotspur and appeared in the May 2009 edition of Hotspur, the football club's official club magazine.

World Championship results

BDO

2000: 1st round (lost to Matt Clark 1–3)
2001: Semi-finals (lost to John Walton 3–5)
2002: Quarter-finals (lost to Colin Monk 4–5)

PDC

2003: 3rd round (lost to Phil Taylor 3–5)
2004: Semi-finals (lost to Phil Taylor 2–6)
2005: Semi-finals (lost to Mark Dudbridge 4–6)
2006: Semi-finals (lost to Phil Taylor 5–6)
2007: 1st round (lost to Alan Caves 2–3)
2008: Semi-finals (lost to Kirk Shepherd 4–6)
2009: 3rd round (lost to Co Stompé 0–4)
2010: 1st round (lost to Jyhan Artut 0–3)

Career finals

PDC major finals: 3 (3 runners-up)

Performance timeline

References

External links

 Official website
 Wayne Mardle's profile and stats Darts Database

English darts players
1973 births
Living people
Professional Darts Corporation former tour card holders
British Darts Organisation players
Darts commentators
PDC ranking title winners